Jean Liberte (March 20, 1896 - 1965) was an Italian-American artist and art teacher. He emigrated to the United States in 1900, and was educated at the Cooper Union. He taught at the Art Students League of New York from 1945 until his death. He was a noted for his use of casein paint.

Education 
Liberte graduated from Cooper Union in 1916. He studied at the Art Students League of New York in the 1920s under Kenneth Hayes Miller, where Yasuo Kuniyoshi, Reginald Marsh and Kimon Nicolaides were his classmates.

Awards 
 William A. Clark Prize, Corcoran Gallery of Art, Washington D.C., 1945
 Adolph and Clara Obrig Prize, National Academy of Design, 1950
 Audubon Artists, First Prize for Watercolor, 1947
 Audubon Artists, First Prize for Casein Painting, 1948

References

External links
 Jean Liberté Papers, Special Collections Research Center, Syracuse University Libraries

1896 births
1965 deaths
Cooper Union alumni
Art Students League of New York faculty
Italian emigrants to the United States